Group D of UEFA Women's Euro 2022 was played from 10 to 18 July 2022. The pool was made up of France, Italy, Belgium and Iceland. Iceland drew all their matches and became the first undefeated team not to advance to the quarter-finals.

Teams

Notes

Standings

Matches

Belgium vs Iceland

France vs Italy

Italy vs Iceland

France vs Belgium

Iceland vs France

Italy vs Belgium

Discipline
Fair play points will be used as tiebreakers in the group if the overall and head-to-head records of teams were tied. These are calculated based on yellow and red cards received in all group matches as follows:

 first yellow card: plus 1 point;
 indirect red card (second yellow card): plus 3 points;
 direct red card: plus 4 points;
 yellow card and direct red card: plus 5 points;

References

External links

Group C